Boʻrbaliq ( or Burbaliq / Бурбалиқ) is an urban-type settlement in Oltiariq District of Fergana Region. It is located on an elevation of  500 metres above the sea level. Boʻrbaliq is known for the 18th-19th century "Doʻsti Xudo" mosque. The town population was 16,600 in 2016. In 2009, Boʻrbaliq was given urban settlement status. The local time is UTC(+5) (UZT).

See also 
Eskiarab
Rishton
Farg'ona

References

External links 
https://uz.geoview.info/burbaliq,1514316

Populated places in Fergana Region
Urban-type settlements in Uzbekistan